Dmitry Vladimirovich Ovsiannikov (Russian: Дмитрий Владимирович Овсянников; born on 21 February 1977) is a Russian politician who served as Governor of Sevastopol from 18 September 2017 to 11 July 2019. He is considered a protege of Sergey Chemezov.

Biography

Dmitry Ovsiannikov was born in Omsk, Omsk Oblast, in Siberia on 21 February 1977. In August 2001, at the age of 24, he entered the Russian State staff reserve and was appointed Federal Inspector in Kirov Oblast.

He served as Deputy Minister of Industry and Commerce of the Russian Government between 23 December 2015 and 28 July 2016, when he was made the so-called Governor of Sevastopol following the resignation of Sergey Menyaylo. He was later elected as a United Russia candidate to the office in September 2017, receiving 71% of the vote (voter turnout in this election was 34%).

The European Union has imposed sanctions on Dmitry Ovsiannikov as a result of participating in unrecognized (by the EU and others) elections.

On 11 July 2019, Ovsiannikov resigned from his post as Governor of Sevastopol.

Personal life
Ovsyannikov is married and has two children.

References

1977 births
Living people
United Russia politicians
Russian individuals subject to European Union sanctions